"Refrain" (stylized as "REFRAIN") is a song by Mamoru Miyano, released as his fifth single. The single also included "Ao no Tsubasa", the opening theme song to the game Uta no Prince-sama. The song was released on October 21, 2009.

Reception

The single ranked #24 on the Oricon Weekly Singles Chart.

Track listing

Charts

References

2009 singles
2009 songs
J-pop songs
Japanese-language songs
King Records (Japan) singles
Video game theme songs